

Steam locomotive classes 

Below is a table of information for the Northern Pacific Railway’s steam roster with a symbol, Whyte notation, common name and notes. (The notes were compiled by Richard Boyland and Wes Barris and first posted May 30, 1991, to the electronic newsgroup rec.railroad.) Included is a breakdown of the Northern Pacific classes, along with the date of their first construction (when known), builder, and road numbers.

0-4-0

0-6-0

0-8-0

2-6-0

2-6-2

2-8-0

2-8-2

2-10-0

On the NP the Decapods were used at either end of a very short train over the temporary switchback line across Stampede Pass while Stampede Tunnel was being constructed between 1887 and 1888. They featured blind drivers (no flanges on the wheels) for operation on sharp curves. They were later relegated to use as yard switchers.

4-4-0

4-4-2

4-6-0

4-6-2

4-8-0

4-8-4

Mallet and simple articulated locomotives

Both of the Northern Pacific's 2-6-6-2 classes were copies of GN designs, including their Belpaire fireboxes, a rarity on NP steam locomotives. NP 3015, last of the Class Z's, had a troubled existence, suffering a crown sheet failure at Kennedy, Washington, on Stampede Pass circa 1916, then later derailing on the Wallace Branch in Idaho in 1933. In both instances the engine crew members were killed or injured.

The Z-2 2-8-8-2s wound up in helper service on Bozeman Pass. The Z-3s, purchased in successive batches, became the main line road and helper power on the route across Stampede Pass until the arrival of EMD's FTs in April, 1944. They were also used as helpers on the steep ascent of the NP's Prairie Line out of Tacoma, Washington, as well as in hauling wartime munitions trains over Stimson Hill between Elma, Washington and the Puget Sound Naval Shipyard at Bremerton, Washington, circa 1944–1945.

The Z-5 Yellowstones were two locomotives under one boiler, these were the largest locomotives in the world when delivered in 1928. They eliminated the use of two locomotives on the head-end of freight trains on the Yellowstone Division in eastern Montana and western North Dakota. The 2-8-8-4 was first built for the Northern Pacific Railway in 1928.

The 4-6-6-4 locomotives were so large that in many places in Montana the Northern Pacific had to widen the centers of its double track on the Rocky Mountain Division. As a rule they did not work west of Easton, Washington, due to the confines of Stampede Tunnel under the summit of Stampede Pass. Despite the inaccuracy, these classes were generally referred to by NP engine crews as Mallets.

Diesel locomotives

American Locomotive Company
Northern Pacific Railway's Alcos were mostly confined to the east end of the road, on the Lake Superior and St. Paul Divisions.

Baldwin Locomotive Works

Electro-Motive Division

General Electric

References

Schrenk, Lorenz P., and Frey, Robert L. (1997). Northern Pacific Classic Steam Era. Mukilteo, Washington: Hundman Publishing.
Schrenk, Lorenz P., and Frey, Robert L. (1985). Northern Pacific Railway Supersteam Era 1925–1945. San Marino, California:  Golden West Books.

 
Railway locomotive-related lists